Into Harm's Way is a 2012 American documentary film. The film features a series of interviews with the members of the United States Military Academy class of 1967 and their experiences during their college career at West Point and later in the Vietnam War. The movie was produced and directed by Jordan Kronick for the West Point Center for Oral History. The Center's director, journalist Todd Brewster, served as the film's executive producer.  The film opened at the GI Film Festival on May 15, 2012.

References

External links
 Into Harm's Way Official Web Site
 
 Into Harm's Way page at KQED
  Into Harm's Way intro to documentary at Vimeo by "The Documentary Group"

2012 films
2012 in American television
2012 documentary films
Documentary films about veterans
Documentary films about the Vietnam War
American documentary television films
American independent films
Films scored by Anton Sanko
2010s English-language films
2010s American films